Jepson Art Institute, founded in 1945 by artist Herbert Jepson, was an art school located at  2861 West 7th Street in the Westlake district of central Los Angeles, California.

It flourished  from 1947 to 1953 — becoming an important center for experimental figure drawing, art theory (aesthetics) and printmaking. Prior to this, Jepson served as an instructor at L.A.'s esteemed Chouinard Art Institute for a dozen years. The Jepson Art Institute closed in 1954.

Faculty
On the faculty, internationally acclaimed figurative artists Rico Lebrun and Francis de Erdely attracted students who later achieved distinction in their own fields such as sculptor Marisol Escobar ("Marisol"), painters Frederick Hammersley and Delmer J. Yoakum, illustrator David Passalaqua, art director Richard Bousman, and architectural sculptor Malcolm  Leland.

Show business luminaries of the period such as Vincent Price, Zero Mostel and comedian Fannie Brice (artist/instructor William Brice's mother) often came to the Jepson Art Institute to hear the lectures of Lebrun and to sit in on classes with Jepson, who was known as a consummate figure draughtsman.

The art of serigraphy was pioneered at the Jepson Art Institute by printmaker Guy Maccoy, who was among the first to develop the techniques of silk screen printing as a fine art medium. Jepson was also the founder of the Western Institute of Serigraphy.

Other instructors included Hammersley, William Brice, Howard Warshaw, Milly Rocque, Geno Pettit and Roger Hollenbeck. The Institute's Design department included teachers Bill Moore, a well known graphic designer, advertising art director C. Manfred Grove, Gene Allen, and Kip Stewart, who later became a well-known California designer.

Notable alumni

 Wallace Berman
 Frank Tolles Chamberlin
 Marisol Escobar
 James Grant
 Frederick Hammersley
 Robert Irwin
 Shirley Silvey
 Morton Traylor
 David Weidman
 Delmer J. Yoakum

References

External links
 Mgaa.net: Herbert Jepson biography

Art schools in California
Universities and colleges in Los Angeles
Defunct private universities and colleges in California
Westlake, Los Angeles
Arts organizations established in 1945
Educational institutions established in 1945
Educational institutions disestablished in 1954
1945 establishments in California
1954 disestablishments in California
Art in Greater Los Angeles